The Admission Act, formally An Act to Provide for the Admission of the State of Hawaii into the Union is a statute enacted by the United States Congress and signed into law by President Dwight D. Eisenhower which dissolved the Territory of Hawaii and established the State of Hawaii as the 50th state to be admitted into the Union. Statehood became effective on August 21, 1959. Hawaii remains the most recent state to join the United States.

Hawaii statehood and international law
Prior to 1959, Hawaii was an organized incorporated territory of the United States. The territory was established in 1900 by the Hawaiian Organic Act. In 1946, the United Nations listed Hawaii as a non-self-governing territory under the administration of the United States (Resolution 55(I) of 1946-12-14). Also listed as non-self-governing territories under the jurisdiction of the United States were Alaska Territory, American Samoa, Guam, the Panama Canal Zone, Puerto Rico, and the Virgin Islands.

Statehood vote

Out of a total population of 600,000 in the islands and 155,000 registered voters, 140,000 votes were cast, the highest turnout ever in Hawaii. The vote showed approval rates of at least 93% by voters on all major islands. Of the approximately 140,000 votes cast, fewer than 8,000 rejected the Admission Act of 1959.

Opposition to statehood
The acceptance of statehood for Hawaii was not without its share of controversy. There were Native Hawaiians who protested against statehood. Prior to admission, various bills creating the state were stalled in congressional hearings since the early 1900s. There was a fear of establishing a state that was governed by an ethnic minority, namely the large Asian American population. Some lawmakers worried about the addition of Hawaii's residents to the United States, in light of protests and possibly split loyalties.

Upon the election of John A. Burns from the Hawaii Democratic Party as delegate of the Territory of Hawaii to Congress, southern leaders charged that Burns' election was evidence of Hawaii as a haven for communism. Burns, in 1959, would reflect on the obstacles against the statehood campaign and place more emphasis on the resistance to statehood in the islands, rather than in Washington itself.

The reasons why Hawaii did not achieve statehood, say, ten years ago—and one could without much exaggeration say sixty years ago—lie not in the Congress but in Hawaii. The most effective opposition to statehood has always originated in Hawaii itself. For the most part it has remained under cover and has marched under other banners. Such opposition could not afford to disclose itself, since it was so decidedly against the interests and desires of Hawaii's people generally.

Southern lawmakers
Burns was involved in vigorous lobbying of his colleagues persuading them that the race-based objections were unfair and charges that Communist sympathizers controlled Hawaii were false. Upon leaving her seat as delegate from Hawaii, Elizabeth P. Farrington said, "Of course, [Democratic Majority Leader] Lyndon Johnson was no friend of statehood." Farrington added, "There were 22 times when he voted against us. He did everything he could, because he was representing the Southern racial opposition." Minutes from Johnson's tenure as head of the Senate Democratic Policy Committee indicate his repeated concessions on the issue to the segregationist Senator Richard Russell.

Alice Kamokila Campbell
On the 53rd anniversary of the overthrow of the Hawaiian Kingdom, January 17, 1946, Territorial Senator Alice Kamokila Campbell, one of the few voices that opposed statehood for Hawaii, offered her testimony to the joint congressional committee sent to investigate and report on statehood. Kamokila Campbell testified at Iolani Palace in front of a small crowd of 600 to frequent applause. There she stated.

I do not feel...we should forfeit the traditional rights and privileges of the natives of our islands for a mere thimbleful of votes in Congress, that we, the lovers of Hawaii from long association with it should sacrifice our birthright for the greed of alien desires to remain on our shores, that we should satisfy the thirst for power and control of some inflated industrialists and politicians who hide under the guise of friends of Hawaii, yet still keeping an eagle eye on the financial and political pressure button of subjugation over the people in general of these islands.

In 1947 Kamokila Campbell opened the Anti-Statehood Clearing House, where she sent "anti-statehood information, reports and arguments to congress."

On March 29, 1949, Kamokila Campbell successfully sued the Hawaii Statehood Commission, to stop them from spending public money to lobby for statehood, invalidating a single section of the Act which created the Hawaii Statehood Commission.

Formation of the state
The State of Hawaii's territory was defined thus in the Act:

References

External links
Hawaii-nation.org: "An Act to Provide for the Admission of the State of Hawaii into the Union" — (Act of March 18, 1959, Pub L 86-3, § 1, 73 Stat 4)
UScode.house.gov: USC 48 Ch 3, S. 3 HAWAII

Legal history of Hawaii
1959 in Hawaii
United States federal civil rights legislation
United States federal territory and statehood legislation
Pre-statehood history of Hawaii
86th United States Congress
1959 in the United States